The Licoreros de Pampero was a baseball club who played from 1955 through 1962 in the Venezuelan Professional Baseball League. The team joined the league as a replacement for the Patriotas de Venezuela and played its home games at the Estadio Universitario in Caracas.

History
The Pampero team was sponsored by the rum company of that name, and was managed by former Washington Senators catcher Fermin Guerra in its inaugural season. The team finished second behind the champions Industriales de Valencia, relegating the strong Leones del Caracas and Navegantes del Magallanes to the following places in the four-team league. The pitching staff was headed by Clarence Churn, who posted a 10–4 record and a 3.04 earned run average, while tying for the most wins with Magallanes' Ramón Monzant and Caracas' Cal McLish. Besides Churn, Roger Bowman went 9–6 with a 3.55 ERA and 70 strikeouts. Meanwhile, the offense was clearly led by Pedro Formental (.368, six home runs, 32 runs batted in), Mike Goliat (.287, four HR, 34 RBI) and Loren Babe (.293, 43 runs scored, 25 RBI).

But the team suffered three losing campaigns in a row, before rebounding somewhat in 1959–60 with a 15–13 record in a season shortened by a players' strike. Their most productive season came in 1960–61, when they finished 28–24 for a 3rd place, but did not qualify for the playoffs.

The Licoreros finished last in 1961–62 and ceased operations at the end of the season. After that, Pampero was sold for the symbolic price of one Venezuelan bolívar by its major shareholder Alejandro Hernández to José Antonio Casanova, by this time the team's skipper. Casanova, who did not have enough financial resources to go through an entire season, made an alliance with a significant group of personalities and traders to acquire the franchise. Then it was renamed the Tiburones de La Guaira and debuted in the 1962–63 season.

Yearly Team Records

Notable players

Teolindo Acosta
Bob Alexander
Matty Alou
Ken Aspromonte
John André
Loren Babe
Frank Barnes
Bo Belinsky
Babe Birrer
Charlie Bishop
Dámaso Blanco
Gary Blaylock
Bob Bowman
Roger Bowman
Joe Caffie
Chico Carrasquel
Elio Chacón
Neil Chrisley
Clarence Churn
Gene Collins
Clay Dalrymple
Joe Durham
Pedro Formental
Mike Goliat
Ross Grimsley
Eli Grba
Hal Griggs
Connie Grob
Fermin Guerra
Bob Hale
Buddy Hicks
Dave Hoskins
Don Johnson
Gordon Jones
Lou Limmer
Don Lock
Joe Lonnett
Jim Marshall
Dolan Nichols
Buddy Peterson
Leo Posada
Rudy Regalado
Luis Romero Petit
Luis Salazar
Jack Spring
Joe Stanka
Lee Thomas
Fred Valentine

Team highlights
1955–56: Clarence Churn, tied for the most victories among pitchers with 10.
1956–57: Lou Limmer, led the league with 41 RBIs.
1957–58: 
Teolindo Acosta, won the batting title with a .385 average.
Mike Goliat, led the league with 28 RBIs.
1958–59: Rudy Regalado, won the batting title with a .366 average.
1959–60:
 Gene Collins, led the league with a .356 batting average and 17 RBIs.
Babe Birrer, posted the best ERA among pitchers with a 1.89 mark.
1960–61:
Don Lock, led the league with 10 home runs
Babe Birrer, posted the best ERA among pitchers with a 1.64 mark.
1961–62: Bo Belinsky, led all pitchers with a 2.13 ERA and set an all-time record with 156 strikeouts.

Sources
 Gutiérrez, Daniel; Alvarez, Efraim; Gutiérrez (h), Daniel (2006). La Enciclopedia del Béisbol en Venezuela. LVBP, Caracas. 
 Gutiérrez, Daniel; González, Javier (1992). Numeritos del béisbol profesional venezolano (1946–1992). LVBP, Caracas.

External links
Meridiano.com – Historia de la Liga Venezolana de Béisbol Profesional (Spanish)
PuraPelota.com – Licoreros de Pampero
es.Wikipedia.org – Historia del béisbol en Venezuela
es.Wikipedia.org – Licoreros de Pampero
es.Wikipedia.org – Liga Venezolana de Béisbol Profesional

1956 establishments in Venezuela
Sport in Caracas
Defunct baseball teams in Venezuela
Baseball teams established in 1956